Pascal Pannier (born 1 November 1998) is a German footballer who plays as a midfielder for NOFV-Oberliga Süd club SG Union Sandersdorf.

Career
Born in Wittenberg, Pannier started his senior career at Hallescher FC, where he made his professional debut on 26 August 2017 as a second-half substitute in a 1–1 draw away to Karlsruher SC. After four appearances for Halle, he left the club in the summer of 2018, joining Regionalliga Nordost side 1. FC Lokomotive Leipzig on a two-year contract.

References

External links
 

1998 births
People from Wittenberg
Footballers from Saxony-Anhalt
Living people
German footballers
Association football midfielders
Hallescher FC players
1. FC Lokomotive Leipzig players
BSG Chemie Leipzig (1997) players
3. Liga players
Regionalliga players
Oberliga (football) players